Quilici is a surname of Italian origin. Notable people with the name include:

 Alex Quilici, American engineer and businessman
 Brando Quilici, Italian filmmaker
 Folco Quilici (1930–2018), Italian film director and screenwriter
 Frank Quilici (1939–2018), American baseball infielder and manager
 Giovanni Battista Quilici (1791–1844), Italian Roman Catholic priest

Italian-language surnames